Ethan Cepuran (born May 13, 2000) is an American speed skater who represented the United States at the 2022 Winter Olympics.

Career
Cepuran competed at the 2018 World Junior Speed Skating Championships and won a silver medal in the mass start event.

Cepuran won the 5,000 metres event at the 2022 U.S. Olympic Team Trials, becoming the first speed skater to qualify for the Olympic team. He represented the United States at the 2022 Winter Olympics in the 5000 metres and team pursuit where he won a bronze medal.

References

2000 births
Living people
American male speed skaters
People from Glen Ellyn, Illinois
Speed skaters at the 2022 Winter Olympics
Medalists at the 2022 Winter Olympics
Olympic bronze medalists for the United States in speed skating